Irish Chileans (in Spanish: Hiberno-chilenos, Irish: Gael-Sileánach) are the inhabitants of Chile who either came from some part of the island of Ireland or are descendants of immigrants from there. Generally coming in the 18th century and early 19th century, the generally Catholic Irish were seeking refuge from the oppression of the Protestant-run government of the Kingdom of Great Britain. Spain, being a Catholic power, enticed many Irish to move to Latin America. Immigration diminished later in the 19th century as Catholic Emancipation made emigration to a Catholic nation less of a vital consideration and as the United States and Canada established themselves as more viable lands for settlement.

A large proportion of Irish Chileans are sheep farmers in the Magallanes Region of the far south of the country, and the city of Punta Arenas has a large Irish foundation dating back to the 18th century.

The most notable Irish Chilean, Bernardo O'Higgins is often referred to as the "Father of Chile", and is commemorated in many places in Chile.

Notable Irish Chileans

Jorge Arrate, Communist Party of Chile politician.
Patricio Aylwin, President of Chile
Paz Bascuñán Aylwin actress
Alberto Blest Gana (1830-1920), a Chilean novelist and diplomat 
Pedro Dartnell Chilean Army Inspector General
Carlos Ibáñez del Campo, Chilean general and twice president of the republic
Patricio Lynch Admiral of the Chilean Navy
Juan Mackenna General, Chilean patriot
Pablo Mackenna, writer, TV host, poet
Bernardo O'Higgins Supreme Director of Chile
Sandra O'Ryan actress
Benjamín Vicuña Mackenna politician, writer (Irish grandfather: Juan MacKenna).
Camila Vallejo (Vallejo-Dowling), Communist Youth of Chile politician.

References

See also

Chile–Ireland relations
Irish Argentines
Irish Mexicans

Chilean
Chile
European Chilean